Paramavatar Shri Krishna (English: Lord Krishna) is an Indian mythological television serial that has aired on &TV since 19 June 2017. It is based on the life of the Hindu deity Krishna, the eighth avatar of Vishnu.

Synopsis
The story revolves around the birth and life of Krishna, the central character of the Hindu epic Mahabharata.

Cast and characters

Main
 Sudeep Sahir as Lord Krishna
 Nirnay Samadhiya as Child Krishna
 Amandeep Sidhu / Hunar Hali as Rukmani / Sita
 Tushar Chawla as Balram
 Aryavart Mishra as Child Balram
 Mahi Soni as Child Radha
 Siddhiksha Singha as Baby Radha
 Gulki Joshi as Mata Devaki
 Chaitanya Choudhury as Vasudeva
 Tiya Gandwani as Rohini
 Gungun Uprari as Mata Yashoda
 Sachin Shroff as Nanda Baba
 Manish Wadhwa as Kans

Recurring
 Barkha Sengupta as Draupadi
 Ankit Bathla as Arjuna
 Prateik Chaudhary as Arjuna
 Neel Motwani as Karna
 Abhishek Tiwari as Yudhishthir
 Danish Akhtar Saifi as Bheem
 Veer Arya as Duryodhana
 Vishal Karwal / Himmanshoo A. Malhotra as Vishnu
 Neha Sargam as Goddess Lakshmi
 Tarun Khanna / Diwakar Pundir as Lord Shiva
 Dharti Bhatt as Goddess Parvati
 Amardeep Garg as Lord Brahma
 Shailendra Vyas as Akrur

 Anil Sharma as Damodar
 Komal Sharma as Asti
 Garima Joshi as Prapti
 Deepak Jethi as Shridhar
 Hemant Choudhary / Chetanya Adib as Parashurama
 Abhilash Chaudhary as Lord Surya
 Ram Awana / Gireesh Sahdev as Maharaj Bali
 Shiv as Lakshmana
 Kumar Hegde as Alambasur
 Neetha Shetty as Goddess Yogmaya
 Riyanka Chanda as Devi Ila
 Romanch Mehta as Vrishbhan
 Rajeev Bharadwaj / Nirbhay Wadhwa as Kalyavan
 Rahul Jat as Kedar
 Firoz Ali as King Bhismak (Rukmini's father)
 Athar Siddiqui as Kaliya Naag
 Simran Khanna / Jaya Bhattacharya as Kunti
 Pragyaj Jain as Child Arjuna
 Shoaib Khan as Child Sudama
 Ekta Tiwari as Jara

 Yashu Dhiman as Kirti
 Puneet Issar / Raj Premi as Jarasandha
 Raj Singh as Narada
 Ram Mehar Jangra as Manik
 Gurpreet Bedi as Kesani
 Sandeep Bhojak As King Rambh
 Krutika Desai Khan as Chandalni
 Nagesh Salwan as Guru Gargacharya
 Salman Shaikh as Rukmi
 Shresth Kumar as Paundraka Vasudeva
 Dakssh Ajit Singh as Shishupala
 Aishwarya Raj Bhakuni as Shubrata
 Jiten Lalwani as Shani
 Anshul Bammi as Nakul / Devraj Indra
 Archi Kalsi as Sahdev
 Sunil Singh as Drupad
 Vinod Kapoor as Dronacharya
 Shweta Dadhich as Drupad's Wife
 Amit Dolawat as Shikhandini
 Anil Lalwani as Dhrishtadyumna

 Deepak Dutta as Dhritarashtra
 Kashish Duggal as Gandhari
 Rahul Rana as Dushasan
 Sooraj Thapar as Shakuni
 Brownie Parashar as Vidur
 Viren Singh as Ashwatthama
 Saurabh Makhija as Vikarna
 Manav Sohal as Adhirath Sushen
 Varsha Chandra as Radha
 Rohit Sagar as Satrajit
 Raj Logani / Gautam Handa as Indra
 Shagun Sharma as Satyabhama
 Aleya Ghosh as Vajrabala / Kaumodaki / Jambavati
 Gaurav Walia as Purochan
 Samrat Soni as Jambavan
 Daya Shankar Pandey as Sudama
 Aamir Rafiq as Vayu
 Shruti Gholap as Susheela
 Yajuvendra Singh as Sanjay
 Sumit Verma as Virochan

See also
 Baal Krishna
 Jai Shri Krishna

References

External links
 Paramavatar Shri Krishna at ZEE5
 

&TV original programming
2017 Indian television series debuts
Television series based on Mahabharata
Krishna in popular culture